Ái Châu was a historical province of Vietnam under the third Chinese domination (Bắc thuộc) roughly equivalent to Thanh Hóa province today.

In 989 after an upland chieftain, named Dương Tiến Lục, had reported to Lê Hoàn that local militia from the aboriginal prefectures of Ái Châu and Hoan Châuse planned to resist Lê control, the king authorised an attack on the prefectures.

References

Former provinces of Vietnam
Prefectures of the Sui dynasty
Prefectures of the Tang dynasty
Prefectures of Southern Han